Gehringia olympica is a species of ground beetles (family Carabidae), the only species in the genus Gehringia.

It is a rather unusual member of its family, a tiny shiny-black beetle with a few stout bristles, and is not found anywhere outside the Pacific Northwest of North America, from Montana and Oregon in the United States northwards to the North West Territories and Yukon in Canada. It inhabits mountain stream gravel banks and can locally be very common. The relationships of this distinct montane endemic have been long debated; variously, it was assigned to subfamily Psydrinae or Trechinae and here it is treated in the former.

References

External Links 
 ToLweb: Gehringia olympica

Psydrinae
Monotypic Carabidae genera